"Put Your Records On" is a song by English singer Corinne Bailey Rae from her self-titled debut studio album (2006). Written by Bailey Rae, John Beck, and Steve Chrisanthou, it was released as the album's second single in February and early March 2006 throughout Europe and as the lead single in North America.

"Put Your Records On" was a commercial success, topping the UK R&B Chart and peaking at number two on UK Singles Chart. It was nominated for Record of the Year and Song of the Year at the 2007 Grammy Awards. A cover by American indie rock project Ritt Momney, released in 2020, became a commercial success after going viral on TikTok.

Song information
The opening verse of the track pays homage to "Three Little Birds" by Bob Marley and the Wailers.

Produced by Steve Chrisanthou, "Put Your Records On" entered and peaked at number two on the UK Singles Chart on 26 February 2006 – for the week ending dated 4 March 2006 – beaten to the top by "Sorry" by Madonna. It topped the UK Singles Downloads Chart and the UK R&B Singles Chart. In the United States, the single peaked at number 64 on the Billboard Hot 100, and had sold 945,000 downloads as of January 2010.

The song earned a Grammy Award nomination for Song of the Year and Record of the Year in 2007.

The song was used in the 2006 film Venus starring Peter O'Toole and is also featured in the 2009 film Alvin and the Chipmunks: The Squeakquel as a cover by The Chipettes.

Track listings
UK CD single
"Put Your Records On"
"Another Rainy Day"

International CD single
"Put Your Records On"
"Another Rainy Day"
"Since I've Been Loving You" (Led Zeppelin cover)

DVD single
"Put Your Records On"
"Put Your Records On" (video)
"Put Your Records On" (]ive at Bush Hall)
"Since I've Been Loving You" (Led Zeppelin cover)

7-inch single
A. "Put Your Records On"
B. "Since I've Been Loving You" (Led Zeppelin cover)

Digital download
"Put Your Records On" (acoustic)

iTunes Store digital download version 1
"Put Your Records On"
"Since I've Been Loving You" (Led Zeppelin cover)

iTunes Store digital download version 2
"Put Your Records On"
"Another Rainy Day"

iTunes Store single
"Put Your Records On"

Credits and personnel
Credits adapted from the liner notes of Corinne Bailey Rae.

 Corinne Bailey Rae – acoustic guitar, backing vocals, lead vocals, percussion, songwriting
 John Beck – keyboards, songwriting
 Steve Chrisanthou – electric guitar, horn sampling, percussion, production, programming, recording, songwriting, Spanish guitar
 Jim Corry – tenor saxophone
 Sam Dixon – bass
 Jimmy Hogarth – additional production
 Jason Rae – alto saxophone
 Cara Robinson – additional backing vocals
 Malcolm Strachan – trumpet
 Joe Tatton – Hammond organ
 Jeremy Wheatley – mixing

Charts

Weekly charts

Year-end charts

Certifications and sales

Release history

Ritt Momney version

A cover of "Put Your Records On" was released by American indie rock solo project Ritt Momney (real name Jack Rutter) on 24 April 2020, originally independently through DistroKid and later re-released through Disruptor Records and Columbia Records.

The song became a sleeper hit after gaining popularity on the video sharing service TikTok in September 2020. Domestically, it peaked at number 30 on the Billboard Hot 100. The song also charted in the top 40 of 15 countries, and peaked in the top 10 in Australia and New Zealand.

Background
During Rutter's childhood, his mother often played Rae's recording of "Put Your Records On" while driving. He referred to the original as "one of the greatest pop songs of all time". He recorded "Put Your Records On" in the basement of his parents' home after experiencing a bout of depression brought on by the COVID-19 pandemic. In an interview with Rolling Stone, Rutter said, "I couldn’t handle writing a depressing song...I started playing around with the idea of manifesting happiness instead of projecting my own sadness."

The cover gained traction after being used in a makeup video on TikTok by user Skiian, starting a trend on the platform.

Commercial performance
Following its viral success, "Put Your Records On" debuted on the Billboard Hot 100 at number 96, having received 5.8 million streams and one thousand digital downloads domestically in the tracking week ending 1 October, eventually peaking at number 30. The song peaked at number 55 on the Billboard Global 200 chart. The song also debuted at number 82 on the US Rolling Stone Top 100.

Elsewhere, "Put Your Records On" debuted at number 36 in Australia, eventually peaking at number 10. The song also peaked at number 18 in Ireland, and at number 25 in the United Kingdom.

Charts

Weekly charts

Year-end charts

Certifications

Releases

References

External links
 

Corinne Bailey Rae songs
2006 songs
2006 singles
2020 singles
Capitol Records singles
Columbia Records singles
Disruptor Records singles
EMI Records singles
Songs written by Corinne Bailey Rae
Songs written by John Beck (songwriter)
Songs written by Steve Chrisanthou